Needville Independent School District is a public school district based in unincorporated Fort Bend County, Texas (USA) (with a Needville postal address).

In addition to Needville, the district also serves the town of Fairchilds, a portion of Pleak, and the unincorporated communities of Guy and Long Point.

History
Needville ISD, originally Needville Rural High School District, was formed by the merger of the Big Creek, Brown, Concord, Forester, Guy, Marlow, Modena, Needville, Seiler, and Williams School districts on December 17, 1946; this made it the first consolidated school district to form in Fort Bend County. The district's first board meeting was held on January 9, 1947.

Previously, students from the community of Damon attended Needville High since Damon Independent School District did not have a high school. Damon ISD signed a contract with Needville ISD in 1949 so Damon ISD residents could go to school at Needville High.

In 2009, the school district was rated "recognized" by the Texas Education Agency.

In 2014, the school suspended a high school student for refusing to stand for the pledge of allegiance. After media attention, the suspension was eventually lifted due to unconstitutionality.

The School also gained notoriety in 2018 when it threatened to suspend students for participating in protests or demonstrations against gun violence in schools, leading Constitutional law experts to call the policy a violation of student's First Amendment rights.

Schools
Needville High School (Grades 9-12)
Needville Junior High School (Grades 7-8)
Needville Middle School (Grades 5-6)
Needville Elementary School (Grades PK-4)
Before 2007, high school students in Needville attended the old high school across the street. After parts of the school were burnt down due to arson in 2007, the school was put out of use and is only used for certain occasions such as U.I.L. Academic events.

References

External links

You're Facing The ACLU Now, Needville - Houston Press
Long-Haired Native American Boy Blocked From School - Houston Press

School districts in Fort Bend County, Texas
1946 establishments in Texas
School districts established in 1946